Grammont is a commune in the Haute-Saône department in the region of Bourgogne-Franche-Comté in eastern France.

Geography
Grammont is located in the north of the Bourgogne-Franche-Comté, 10 km from Villersexel and 10 km from L'Isle-sur-le-Doubs. The village's name is the combination of the adjective for "large" and the name "mount".

The average altitude of Grammont is 350 m.

The village had 374 inhabitants at the time of the French Revolution of 1789, and 422 during the reign of King Louis-Philippe. As of February 2013, the village had only 63 inhabitants involved in mainly farming. This was down from 2007 in 1974.

Geology
The communal area is based on the Keupérien coalfield Haute-Saône (it is part of the concession Mélecey operated from 1778 to 1865) and the oil shale deposit of Haute-Saône dated Toarcien.

History

In 1308, Guyot II Granges ("Grammont Guyot II") built a castle here. He was in homage to Count Renaud de Montbéliard. The castle was besieged, taken, burned and partially demolished by the Swiss after the battle of Héricourt on November 13, 1474.

By letters patent of 10 March 1657, the land of Grammont was erected in the county in favor of Claude-François de Grammont, honorary knight in Parliament Dole (Jura). After taking Besançon in 1674, Louis XIV made him dismantle the castles of Franche-Comté and Grammont. From 1699, the castle of Villersexel, from the family of Rye, was the new place of residence of the family.

In 1841 Grammont had 422 inhabitants. At the end of the nineteenth century, Chalon-sur-Saône and Grammont were the two largest Eastern horse fairs, with a concentration on the second which went from 400 to 800 hp by year. The Belgian and Italian armies went there sometimes for horses to their artillery; they were led on foot to the station Villersexel by grooms of these armies. The Flemish merchants went there regularly. Then came the First World War, and infectious anemia equine decimated the herd. Mules replaced them; they even harnessed cows.

At Grammont, in the early twentieth century, fairs tools and seeds that correspond to periods of intense work (plowing and haymaking) disappeared. The horse fair, in hollow period, retained all its reason for being in late winter, hence the saying: "After the fair in Grammont is sown oats."

World War II was due to the horse park with massive requisitions of the German army for the needs of the Russian front.

In 1976, the population of Grammont gave back a second wind at the fair to make it a privileged meeting place for the rural world.

Annual fair
The annual fair of Grammont is held on the last Saturday of February. It has a tradition of 500 years and dates back to 1502. The fair features demonstrations of agricultural equipment and farm animals, musical performances and a market of regional produce.

Heraldry

The coat of arms of Grammont is an "Azure three queen busts complexion, and sandy hair and gold crown."

Population

In 2017, the commune of Grammont had 66 inhabitants. In 1841 the population of Grammont peaked at 422, after which it declined.

See also
Communes of the Haute-Saône department

References

Communes of Haute-Saône